Yoon Jin-Hee (Hangul: 윤진희, Hanja: 尹眞熙, ; born August 4, 1986 in Wonju, Gangwon-do) is a South Korean weightlifter.

Career

She ranked 3rd in the Women's 58 kg at the 2005 Junior World Championships in Busan, South Korea, lifting 206 kg in total. She also competed in the Women's 58 kg at the 2005 World Championships in Doha, Qatar and reached the 4th spot with 215 kg in total.

At the 2006 World Weightlifting Championships she ranked fourth in the 58 kg category, and in the 2007 World Weightlifting Championships she won the bronze medal in the 53 kg category with 211 kg in total.

At the 2008 Summer Olympics she won silver medal in women's 53 kg, and at the 2016 Summer Olympics she finished third in the same category. She decided to retire earlier but in 2014 abandoned retirement to compete for South Korea in the national team.

Major result

References

External links
 
 
 
 

1986 births
Living people
South Korean female weightlifters
Weightlifters at the 2008 Summer Olympics
Weightlifters at the 2016 Summer Olympics
Olympic weightlifters of South Korea
Olympic silver medalists for South Korea
Olympic bronze medalists for South Korea
Olympic medalists in weightlifting
Weightlifters at the 2006 Asian Games
Medalists at the 2008 Summer Olympics
Medalists at the 2016 Summer Olympics
Asian Games competitors for South Korea
South Korean Buddhists
World Weightlifting Championships medalists
21st-century South Korean women